Parliamentary elections were held in the Seychelles on 25 April 1974. The result was a victory for the Seychelles Democratic Party, which won 13 of the 15 seats.

Results

References

1974 in Seychelles
Elections in Seychelles
Seychelles
Election and referendum articles with incomplete results